was a Japanese wrestler. He competed in the men's Greco-Roman welterweight at the 1932 Summer Olympics.

References

External links
 

Year of birth missing
Possibly living people
Japanese male sport wrestlers
Olympic wrestlers of Japan
Wrestlers at the 1932 Summer Olympics
Place of birth missing